Korczew may refer to the following places:
Korczew, Bełchatów County in Łódź Voivodeship (central Poland)
Korczew, Zduńska Wola County in Łódź Voivodeship (central Poland)
Korczew, Masovian Voivodeship (east-central Poland)
Gmina Korczew, a rural gmina whose seat is Korczew, Masovian Voivodeship